Adriana Galván is an American psychologist and expert on adolescent brain development. She is a professor of psychology at the University of California, Los Angeles (UCLA) where she directs the Developmental Neuroscience laboratory. She was appointed the Jeffrey Wenzel Term Chair in Behavioral Neuroscience and the Dean of Undergraduate Education at UCLA.

Biography 
Galván completed her bachelor's degree in Neuroscience and Behavior at Barnard College, Columbia University in 2001.  Galván continued her education in neuroscience under the guidance of B.J. Casey at the Weill Medical College of Cornell University, where she completed her PhD in 2006.  She obtained post-doctoral training under the supervision of Russell Poldrack and Susan Bookheimer at the Semel Institute for Neuroscience and Behavior at UCLA from 2006 to 2008, prior to joining the UCLA faculty in 2008. She was the honored recipient of the UCLA Department of Psychology Distinguished Teaching Award (Senior Ladder) in 2015.

Galván is a Fellow of the Association for Psychological Science and a recipient of a U.S. Fulbright Scholarship. Her research program has been supported by grants from the National Institutes of Health,  National Science Foundation, Russell Sage Foundation,  Jacobs Foundation, and the California Tobacco-Related Disease Research Program.

Galván's research team studies the development of the brain from childhood into adolescence and adulthood, using various neuroimaging techniques to study psychological and neurobiological functioning.  Her studies have explored neural mechanisms underlying decision-making and risk-taking,  the influences of stress and other experiences on behavior and brain functioning, and neurobiological factors associated with cigarette smoking in adolescence. Other influential work has focused on how sleep affects the developing brain.

Awards 

 William T. Grant Foundation Young Scholars Award (2013) 
 American Psychological Association (APA)Division 7 Boyd McCandless Award (2014)
 Cognitive Neuroscience Society Young Investigator Award (2016)
 APA Early Career Distinguished Scientific Contribution Award in Developmental Psychology (2016)  
 National Academy of Sciences Troland Award (2019)
 Presidential Early Career Award for Scientists and Engineers (PECASE) (2019)

Books 
 Galván, A. (2017). The Neuroscience of Adolescence. Cambridge University Press.

Representative publications 
 Casey, B. J., Getz, S., & Galván, A. (2008). The adolescent brain. Developmental Review, 28(1), 62–77.
 Galván, A. (2010). Adolescent development of the reward system. Frontiers in Human Neuroscience, 4, 6. 
 Galván, A. (2013). The teenage brain: Sensitivity to rewards. Current Directions in Psychological Science, 22(2), 88–93.
 Galvan, A., Hare, T. A., Davidson, M., Spicer, J., Glover, G., & Casey, B. J. (2005). The role of ventral frontostriatal circuitry in reward-based learning in humans. Journal of Neuroscience, 25(38), 8650–8656.
 Galván, A., Hare, T. A., Parra, C. E., Penn, J., Voss, H., Glover, G., & Casey, B. J. (2006). Earlier development of the accumbens relative to orbitofrontal cortex might underlie risk-taking behavior in adolescents. Journal of Neuroscience, 26(25), 6885–6892.
 Galván, A., Hare, T., Voss, H., Glover, G., & Casey, B. J. (2007). Risk‐taking and the adolescent brain: Who is at risk? Developmental Science, 10(2), F8-F14.

References

External links 
Faculty page 
Research lab website

Living people
Year of birth missing (living people)
American women psychologists
20th-century American psychologists
21st-century American psychologists
Barnard College alumni
Cornell University alumni
University of California, Los Angeles faculty
21st-century American women